In abstract algebra, an additive monoid  is said to be zerosumfree, conical, centerless or positive if nonzero elements do not sum to zero.  Formally:

References 
 

Semigroup theory